Edgar Cárdenas (born 16 September 1974) is a Mexican former professional boxer who competed from 1991 to 2004. He is a former WBC Continental Americas light flyweight, WBO NABO light flyweight, and the IBF minimumweight champion.

Professional career
In December 2000, Edgar won the WBO NABO light flyweight title with a seventh round T.K.O. of veteran Alfredo Virgen.

IBF Minimumweight title
On 31 May 2003 Cárdenas won the IBF minimumweight title by upsetting an undefeated Miguel Barrera; Barrera would never fight again.

Professional boxing record

See also
List of Mexican boxing world champions
List of IBF world champions
List of Minimumweight boxing champions

References

External links

Boxers from Mexico City
International Boxing Federation champions
Mini-flyweight boxers
World mini-flyweight boxing champions
1974 births
Living people
Mexican male boxers